The Thomas R. Cutler Mansion at 150 E. State St. in Lehi, Utah, United States, was built in 1900.  It was possibly designed by architect Walter Ware.  It was listed on the National Register of Historic Places in 1984.

In 1984 it was deemed "historically significant as the home of Thomas R. Cutler, a prominent Utah businessman" and architecturally significant "as one of a very limited number of Colonial Revival boxes in Utah, and as the only documented extant example of the type in a small town in Utah."

References

Colonial Revival architecture in Utah
Houses completed in 1900
Houses in Utah County, Utah
Houses on the National Register of Historic Places in Utah
Buildings and structures in Lehi, Utah
National Register of Historic Places in Utah County, Utah